Peter Fergus McGlynn (born 2 May 1989) is an Irish footballer. Besides the Republic of Ireland, he has played in the United States.

Career

College & Amateur 
McGlynn played five years of college soccer at the University of California, Santa Barbara between 2008 and 2012, including a redshirted year in 2011 due to a season-ending injury. During a match against UC Davis Aggies in 2012, McGlynn was arrested and escorted from the field in handcuffs after he had assaulted the referee.

While at college McGlynn appeared for Premier Development League side Ventura County Fusion in 2012.

Professional 
On 22 January 2013 McGlynn was selected in the fourth round (72nd overall) of the 2012 MLS Supplemental Draft by San Jose Earthquakes. He signed with San Jose on 15 February 2013.

Following his release by San Jose at the end of the 2013 season, McGlynn returned to Ireland and spent time with Drogheda United, Bray Wanderers and Longford Town. McGlynn again headed to the United States on 16 November 2016, when he signed for United Soccer League side Sacramento Republic.

References

External links 
 Sacramento Republic FC player profile
 

1989 births
Living people
Republic of Ireland association footballers
Association football defenders
UC Santa Barbara Gauchos men's soccer players
Ventura County Fusion players
San Jose Earthquakes players
Drogheda United F.C. players
Bray Wanderers F.C. players
Longford Town F.C. players
Sacramento Republic FC players
USL League Two players
USL Championship players
San Jose Earthquakes draft picks